The 2014–15 season of Romania's top level women's football league was the second under the new name Superliga. The old name Liga I is now being used for the new second-level league. It is the 25th season of top-level football and will decide the Romanian champions and UEFA Women's Champions League participant.

Olimpia Cluj were the defending champions and defended their title with a fifth championship title in a row.

Changes from 2013 to 2014
 The league is again divided into a first stage and then a championship and relegation round.
 For the first time club's face relegation, as the bottom two placed clubs are relegated into next season's Liga I.

Standings

Regular season

Championship Group

Relegation Group
Played by the teams placed fifth to eighth of the first stage. Teams play each other twice.

References

External links
 Official site
 Season on soccerway.com

Rom
Fem
Romanian Superliga (women's football) seasons